Army of Darkness: Shop till You Drop Dead is a four-part comic book spin-off published by Devils Due Publishing & Dynamite Entertainment, continuing the comic book saga of The Evil Dead series.

Plot
The story takes place exactly where its predecessor Ashes 2 Ashes finishes, only there is quite a bit of time hopping involved to keep things confusing.

Ash returns from Egypt, believing the Necronomicon Ex-Mortis destroyed for good. However, the evil tome has managed to hitch-hike all the way back to S-Mart and wound up in the hands of Mister Smart himself, Ash's cheerfully irritating boss. When Deadites infest the aisles and consumers start consuming, Ash must team up with his fellow co-workers to start the ultimate wage slave war against evil.

See also
List of Devil's Due Publishing publications

2005 comics debuts
2005 comics endings
Dynamite Entertainment titles
Devil's Due Publishing titles
The Evil Dead (franchise) comics
Comic book limited series